The Galo are a central Eastern Himalayan tribe, who are descendants of  Abotani and speak the Tani Galo language. The Galo people primarily inhabit West Siang, Lepa Rada, and Lower Siang districts of modern-day Arunachal Pradesh state in northeastern India, but they are also found in the southwestern side of East Siang district, the southeastern side of Upper Subansiri district, as well as in some small pockets in Itanagar. Other names which have been used to reference the Galo in the past include Duba, Doba, Dobah Abor, Gallong Abor, Galong, Gallong Adi, etc. The Galo have been listed as a scheduled tribe under the name Gallong since 1950.

Folklore in relation to resource use and management
The fact that Turi or eri, according to Galo's wisdom, can be the common ancestor of Tani (the first human-being and the ancestor of human-beings), Taki (the ancestor of spirits) and Tanyo [the ancestor of cat families which include  (tiger), Nyopak-takar (leopard), Nyoke (Panther), Nyoli, Nyomuk, Nyoji (various species of wild cats)] signifies the harmonious relationship that the Galo society shares with other living and non-living forms. As the saying goes,  That is, ‘O human! What worth is  human life when forests without flora and fauna, rivers without fish’. Instead of assuming themselves as the ‘possessor’ of nature, their core world view of ‘community of beings’ places resource use and its management, apart from providing material sustenance, as a binding agent between human-nature relationship, human-human relationship and human-nature-supernatural relationship. Moreover, resources also act as a metaphysical medium to appease supernatural beings/spirits. Nature, according to Galo’s worldview, has also unknown and destructive dimensions. Thus, periodic rituals with respect to land, water and forests becomes mandatory to pacify the anger of this incomprehensible element of nature, which manifests in the form of spirits.

The constant squabbling over the ownership of land between Tani (the mythical forefather of the Galos) and Taki (the spirit brother of Tani) led to division of ownership of resources: the domesticated ones (one owned by humankind) and the wild ones owned by ethereal beings/spirits. In order to resolve the conflict, Donyi Jilo, a respected priest, intervened and divided the land into momen (the domesticated one) and modir (vertical/land not suitable for human use). Moreover, he explicitly instructed both the beings not to intervene in each-other’s land. However, the Galo people hold the notion that Taki's descendent groups namely, the Doje, Yapom, Pomte- Sarte and the Bute-Kamdu frequently trespasses onto momen inhabiting trees, streams, caves, rocks etc. And the way to honor them is to conduct rituals. One such ritual, Ampu Yolu, is observed in relation to protection of crops from pests and diseases. Through this ritual, the spirits/deities, namely Jeru Poru, Pote, Biro-mugli and Yapom are revered. This helps to attract pests. Moreover, it is considered a boon for good harvest.

Another ritual, dir-tachi, is observed in case of excessive pest infestation. In the past, according to Galo’s wisdom, Tachi was mainly responsible for the famine in the region. Etymologically, dir also signifies famine. The ritualistic process involves tiny packets of edible grains and vegetables in combination with an egg, fowl or a pig, which is offered to the spirit, Uyis. After the ritual, effigies of Uyis, made of bamboo leaves along with other offerings are placed in a bamboo raft (hipe) and immersed in the river. In relation to famine, the Galo's myth goes like this: Diyi Tami, daughter of Mopin and the first wife of Abo Tani, leaves for Digo Pine (the land of Mopin). In her absence, Rosi Tami, daughter of Dir (the famine) and the second wife of Abo Tani, mistakenly puts two grains in a magical pot. In normal circumstances, one grain would be sufficient to prepare enough food for the whole family. Putting two grains result in surplus food. Not knowing what to do, she asks Diro-Kibo (dog of famine) to consume the excess rice. Along with consuming the excess rice, he also consumes the magical power of the pot. Thus, the magical pot loses its inherent capacity to produce huge quantity of rice with a single grain. Subsequently, it led to famine in the region. In order to address the food-shortage, Abo Tani, following the order of Diyi Tami, drowns Rosi Tami in the river and kills Diro-Kibo.

See also
Marriage practices of the Galo tribe

References

Bibliography
 Nyori, Tai (1993). History and Culture of the Adis, Omsons Publications, New Delhi-110 027.
 Post, Mark W. (2007). A Grammar of Galo. PhD Dissertation. Melbourne, La Trobe University Research Centre for Linguistic Typology. 
 Riba, Bomchak. (2009). Relevance of Indigenous Knowledge System of the Galo of Arunachal Pradesh in Sustainable Development of Forest Resources. Ph.D. Thesis, Rajiv Gandhi University, Arunachal Pradesh, India.
 Basar, Jumyir. (2014). INDIGENOUS KNOWLEDGE and RESOURCE MANAGEMENT (Perspectives of a Tribe in Northeast India), Anshah Publishing House, New Delhi-110002

Tribes of Arunachal Pradesh